Blink is an American home automation company which produces battery-powered home security cameras. The company was founded in 2009 by Peter Besen, Don Shulsinger, Dan Grunberg, Stephen Gordon, and Doug Chin. The company was initially started as Immedia Semiconductor Inc in 2009, but pivoted into a consumer electronics company. In July 2014, the company had a Kickstarter campaign for their indoor security camera, which raised over US$1 million. Subsequently, Blink later announced an outdoor security camera, home security system, and video doorbell.

Amazon announced in December 2017 that they had acquired the company. Immedia Semiconductor, LLC continues to operate as an independent subsidiary. It is anticipated that Blink's technology will be used for the Amazon Key service.

In December 2019, Amazon rolled out patches in response to research citing vulnerabilities in the Blink XT2 security camera systems found by vulnerability detection firm Tenable.

Products

Blink Video Doorbell 
The blink video doorbell is an inexpensive wirelessly connected smart device that allows video and audio to be viewed via another device.

Features- 1080p HD, infrared night video, activity zoning, two-way audio, custom alerts, privacy settings, Blink Subscription Plan or locally with the Sync Module 2 and USB drive, Works with Alexa

Installation & Setup- The doorbell is simply installed by a plate that goes on the preferred location. Once the plate is installed the unit can then attach to the plate. Two AA batteries are supplied with the unit and can be inserted into the device. Once powered on the doorbell camera can be set up via the Blink Home Monitor app with instructions to setup an account. The doorbell does require a Wi-Fi connection to work properly.

Blink Plus Subscription- The Blink Plus Subscription plan allows the storage of videos recording by the blink doorbell or any blink device at a fee and is stored via an online cloud. The plan has multiple options including service for 1 device or unlimited devices at a higher fee and can be paid either monthly or yearly.

Sync Module 2- This is an accessory to any blink device can allow storage of any blink device without charging a monthly fee. It works by connecting the device to an internet connection and inserting a USB drive into the device. Once setup it will store any blink device's recordings. The Blink cameras are now easier to control with.

References 

Blink Home
Home automation companies
American companies established in 2009
Companies based in Essex County, Massachusetts
Amazon (company) acquisitions
Kickstarter-funded products
2017 mergers and acquisitions
Andover, Massachusetts